H. bergeri may refer to:
 Homopus bergeri, the Berger's cape tortoise, a turtle species endemic to Namibia
 Hyalinobatrachium bergeri, a frog species found in Bolivia and Peru

See also
 Bergeri (disambiguation)